Alice in Wonderland is a 1981 Soviet animated film based on Lewis Carroll's 1865 novel Alice's Adventures in Wonderland. It was produced by Kievnauchfilm and directed by Yefrem Pruzhanskyy. It originally aired on Ukrainian television in three parts.

Plot 
The cartoon is based on the fairy tale story by Lewis Carroll. One summer, a girl named Alice, chasing a bizarre White Rabbit with a watch in his pocket, fell into a rabbit hole and... found herself in Wonderland, a wonderland.  Here, Alice will have to become smaller and bigger several times, meet the Blue Caterpillar and the Cheshire Cat, go to a "crazy tea party" with the Hatter and the March Hare, find out why gardeners dye roses, meet the Queen of Hearts on the croquet court, and finally take part in the trial of the Jack of Hearts, who stole the royal cutlets.

Voice cast 

 Marina Neyolova as Alice
 Vyacheslav Nevinny as White Rabbit
 Tatyana Vasilyeva as Queen of Hearts
 Rina Zelyonaya as Duchess
 Aleksandr Burmistrov as Hatter
 Yevhen Paperny as Knave of Hearts
 Heorhiy Kyshko as March Hare
 Aleksandr Shirvindt as Cheshire Cat
 Malvina Shvidler as Caterpillar
 Lyudmila Ignatenko as The Dormouse
 Rostislav Plyatt as Narrator

References

External links
 
 

1981 films
1980s Russian-language films
Animated films based on Alice in Wonderland
Kievnauchfilm films
Soviet animated television films